Glory-Anne Carriere (born 1947 in Gravelbourg, Saskatchewan) is a Canadian country singer, who received Juno Award nominations for Most Promising Female Vocalist at the Juno Awards of 1978 and Best Country Female Vocalist at the Juno Awards of 1980. She has recorded and performed both as a solo artist and as a duo with her husband, Ronnie Prophet.

Her singles as a solo artist included "Rocky Road", "Woman Alone", "Kelly Green", "In My Dreams", "Sugartime" and "Small Talk", while her singles as a duo with Prophet included "Storybook Children", "If This Is Love", "I'm Glad We're Bad at Something", "I'll Be There", "Lucky in Love" and "Two Hearts".

References

1947 births
Canadian women country singers
Musicians from Saskatchewan
Fransaskois people
People from Gravelbourg, Saskatchewan
Living people
20th-century Canadian women singers
21st-century Canadian women singers